The first season of JAG premiered on NBC on September 23, 1995, and concluded on July 8, 1996. The season, initially starring David James Elliott and Tracey Needham, was produced by Belisarius Productions in association with NBC Productions and Paramount Television.

Plot 

Lieutenant Harmon "Harm" Rabb Jr. (David James Elliott), a former naval aviator turned lawyer, is employed by the Navy's Judge Advocate General's Corps, the internal law firm of the Department of the Navy. In Washington, D.C., Harm is partnered with Lieutenant Junior Grade Meg Austin (Tracey Needham), a junior officer with drive and determination. Together, Harm and Meg work alongside Commander Alison Krennick (Andrea Thompson), Rear Admiral A.J. Chegwidden (John M. Jackson), and Lieutenant Caitlin Pike (Andrea Parker), as they prosecute and defend the under the Uniform Code of Military Justice (UCMJ). This season, the team investigate the murder of a female naval flight officer ("A New Life"), the death of a civilian contractor ("Shadow"), a training mishap ("Desert Son"), a murder at Arlington National Cemetery with connections to Thai diplomats ("Déjà Vu"), and a murder at the U.S. Embassy in Peru ("War Cries"). Also this season, Harm suffers personal losses when his best friend ("Pilot Error") and girlfriend ("Skeleton Crew") are both killed, Meg faces death when she is critically wounded by an professional assassin ("Hemlock"), and Harm is promoted to the grade of Lieutenant Commander ("Defensive Action").

Production 
Production of the first season of JAG was based at Sunset Gower Studios, right in the heart of Hollywood.

In Spring 1996, NBC announced that they were not commissioning Paramount Television to make a second season of JAG. Creator and Executive producer Donald P. Bellisario states that he had already received offers from CBS and ABC to pick up the series. Bellisario also credits the cancellation with allowing him to create "the show he'd always wanted to make", as NBC had "wanted action, and [he had] wanted a mix of legal [drama] and action".

Cast and characters

Main 
 David James Elliott as Harmon Rabb Jr., Lieutenant Commander
 Andrea Parker as Caitlin Pike, Lieutenant (pilot only; recurring, thereafter)
 Tracey Needham as Meg Austin, Lieutenant J.G. (from episode 1.3)

Recurring 
 John M. Jackson as A. J. Chegwidden, Rear Admiral
 Patrick Labyorteaux as Bud Roberts, Ensign
 Andrea Thompson as Allison Krennick, Commander
 W.K. Stratton as Theodore Lindsey, Commander
 Terry O'Quinn as Thomas Boone, Captain, "CAG"

Guest appearances 
 Kevin Dunn as Rear Admiral Albert Brovo
 Julie Caitlin Brown as Staff Sergeant Carrington 
 Jenny Gago as Sergeant Gonzalez 
 Sam Jenkins as Private Whitley 
 Oliver North as Uncle Ollie
 Rex Linn as Submarine Skipper
 Ryan Hurst as Dirk Grover
 Spencer Garrett as First Lieutenant Vince Boone
 Neal McDonough as First Lieutenant Jay Williams
 Walton Goggins as Communications Officer
 Michael Paul Chan as Ambassador Sonsiri
 Vivian Wu as Angelique Sonsiri
 Ron Livingston as Corporal David Anderson
 Madeline Zima as Kathy Gold
 Catherine Bell as Lieutenant J.G. Diane Schonke

Episodes

See also
 1995–96 United States network television schedule

Notes

References 

01
1995 American television seasons
1996 American television seasons